Freshlocal Solutions Inc. is an online grocer, wholesale distributor, store operator and software licensing company based in Vancouver. The company was founded as Small Potatoes Urban Delivery in 1997. In September 2021 Freshlocal went under new executive leadership which resulted in key leadership changeover and in May 2022 it filled for bankruptcy protection.

Sustainable Produce Urban Delivery 
Sustainable Produce Urban Delivery, or SPUD.ca, is an online grocery service operating in British Columbia and Alberta that predominantly focuses on selling organic groceries.

Be Fresh Local Markets 

In August 2015, Spud.ca opened its first retail store and café, located in the Kitsilano neighbourhood of Vancouver. The stores are located in urban areas and carry a limited amount of products, in addition to ready-made meals. The stores also serve as an order pick-up point for online orders. Most locations are owned by Spud.ca; however, the company has partnered with existing small format retailers in Vancouver and provides these retailers with distribution.

Food-X 
Food-X is a subsidiary of Spud which operates the back-end operations, warehousing, and fulfillment of grocery items on behalf of partner retailers. They operate a 74,000-square-foot warehouse in Burnaby to fulfill orders to Metro Vancouver residents. In February 2018, Walmart announced that Food-X would handle their e-commerce grocery platform in Vancouver.

Blush Lane 
Blush Lane Organic Market is a grocery store chain in Alberta, acquired by Spud in 2017.

References

Further reading
 

Online grocers
Online retailers of Canada
Supermarkets of Canada
Retail companies established in 1997
Food and drink companies based in Vancouver
1997 establishments in British Columbia
B Lab-certified corporations
Companies formerly listed on the Toronto Stock Exchange
Companies that filed for Chapter 11 bankruptcy in 2022